Chahak District is in Khatam County, Yazd province, Iran. At the 2006 National Census, the region's population (as Chahak Rural District of the Central District) was 5,374 in 1,309 households. The following census in 2011 counted 6,025 people in 1,626 households. At the latest census in 2016, there were 6,057 inhabitants in 1,758 households. After the census, the rural district was elevated to the status of a district and split into two rural districts.

References 

Khatam County

Districts of Yazd Province

Populated places in Yazd Province

Populated places in Khatam County

fa:بخش چاهک